Hayfever is a 2010 romantic comedy film written and directed by Laura Luchetti and starring Andrea Bosca, Diane Fleri and Giulia Michelini.

Plot
Rome. The young Camilla is the victim of a small scooter accident. When she is loaded into the ambulance she catches sight of Matteo, who hands her the shoe that she had lost in the accident, and reads the name "Twinkled" on his bag. Once healed, Camilla goes to Twinkled, a modern antiques shop, where she is promptly hired to reorganize the spaces by the thirty-six-year-old owner Stefano, full of debt and therefore in open marital crisis. So she makes friends with her peer Franki, who dreams of Jude Law's love and writes poignant letters to him, and with Matteo, who however does not recognize her. The boy is still in love with his former flame, Giovanna, who had left him, it will be discovered later, for a German girl, Gertrud, with whom he went to live in Berlin.

Camilla, thanks to work and walks with her brother, Gigio, begins to hang out with Matteo. It seems that even on the part of the boy there is more than a sympathy but the unexpected return of Giovanna to the city upsets his feelings, and for this Camilla takes a back seat. When Giovanna confides in Matteo and tells him how he could have given her what she was looking for, Matteo begins to dream of being able to have a family with her. He will soon be disappointed. Meanwhile, Stefano, the owner of the shop, receives a notice of foreclosure, ends up at loggerheads with his wife and therefore decides to give up his dreams, preparing a total sale to settle the debts. For Franki it will be the beginning of an unexpected opportunity to be less of a dreamer and more realistic. And when everything seems to take a certain turn, the final twist will come, which will leave a little bitter taste in the mouth but will serve the characters, and the viewer, to understand some of their mistakes.

Cast 
Andrea Bosca  as Matteo
Diane Fleri as  Camilla
Giulia Michelini as  Franki
 Giuseppe Gandini as Stefano
Camilla Filippi as  Giovanna
 Cecilia Cinardi as  Patrizia 
 Mauro Ursella as  Gigio
 Marco Todisco as  Michelino
Angela Goodwin as Old Lady
 Beniamino Marcone as  Carlo

See also 
 List of Italian films of 2010

References

External links 

2010 romantic comedy films
2010 films
Italian romantic comedy films
2010s Italian-language films
2010s Italian films